Carlos Mardel (born Martell Károly; Pressburg; c. 1695 - Lisbon; 8 September 1763) was a Hungarian-Portuguese military officer, engineer, and architect. Mardel is primarily remembered for his role in the reconstruction effort after the 1755 Lisbon earthquake.

Career
Carlos Mardel was born Martell Károly, in Pressburg (now Bratislava), then in the Kingdom of Hungary, around 1695. He served in the militaries of the Polish–Lithuanian Commonwealth and the Kingdom of Great Britain.

Mardel first came to Portugal in 1733, as a sergeant-major of engineering for a Portuguese infantry. By 1735, Mardel had become the managing architect of the Águas Livres Aqueduct. In this project, he personally designed and oversaw the construction of the Amoreiras Monumental Arch and the Mãe d'Água Water Reserve.

It is known that Mardel was a part of the Portuguese Freemason lodge Casa Real dos Pedreiros Livres da Lusitânia, which operated between 1733 and 1738.

In 1747, owing to his work on the Águas Livres water system, Mardel was appointed Architect of the Royal Household and of the Ancient Military Orders.

Following the 1755 Lisbon earthquake, Mardel was one of the primary architects responsible for the city's reconstruction, alongside Eugénio dos Santos and Manuel da Maia. His roofing designs became a staple of the city's reconstruction.

In 1759, Mardel began construction on a country manor in Oeiras for Sebastião José de Carvalho e Melo, the prime-minister at the time for King Joseph I of Portugal. The palace, known as the Palace of the Marquis of Pombal, is considered one of his magna opera.

By 1762, Mardel had reached the rank of colonel in the Portuguese army.

Works
Note: Italicized works were incomplete when Mardel ceased management of them.
Águas Livre Water System; 1735-1745
Águas Livres Aqueduct; 1735-1744
Amoreiras Monumental Arch; 1740-1744
Arco do Carvalhão; 1742-1745
Mãe d'Água Water Reserve; 1745-1763
Chafariz da Esperança; 1752-1763
Chafariz do Rato; 1753-1754
Estaus Palace; 1755-?
Palace of the Marquis of Pombal; 1759-1763
Monastery of Santa Clara-a-Nova (gate and cloister); 1761

References

Portuguese architects
Hungarian architects
17th-century Hungarian people
18th-century Hungarian people
17th-century Portuguese people
18th-century Portuguese people
1763 deaths
Military personnel from Bratislava
Portuguese people of Hungarian descent
Year of birth uncertain
Architects from Bratislava

es:Carlos Mardel#top